Shabankareh (also Romanized as Shabānkāreh) is a village in Quri Qaleh Rural District, Shahu District, Ravansar County, Kermanshah Province, Iran. At the 2006 census, its population was 394, in 81 families.

References 

Populated places in Ravansar County